Raymond W. "Ducky" Pond (February 17, 1902 – August 25, 1982) was an American football and baseball player and football coach. He was the head football coach at Yale University from 1934 to 1940, and at Bates College in 1941 and from 1946 to 1951, compiling career college football record of 52–55–3. Pond's record at Yale was 30–25–2 record, including a 4–3 mark versus Harvard. He mentored two of the first three winners of the Heisman Trophy, Larry Kelley and Clint Frank. At Bates, Pond led the undefeated and untied 1946 Bobcats squad to the inaugural Glass Bowl.

Pond was a public relations executive after his career in athletics.

Early life and playing career
Pond, after attending high school in Torrington, Connecticut, his birthplace, and the Hotchkiss School, was a member of the Yale Class of 1925, and a 1924 first-team All-American at halfback. Pond starred in the 1923 edition of The Game. He was nicknamed "Ducky" by Grantland Rice for returning a fumble 63 yards that afternoon against Harvard on a field that resembled "seventeen lakes, five quagmires and a water hazard". Yale had not scored a touchdown versus Harvard since the end of World War I.

Coaching career
An uproar engulfed Pond's hiring as head football coach at Yale in 1934.  Though he had been head scout and an assistant for his predecessor, Mal Stevens, who coached from 1928 to 1932, and an alumnus like every head coach before him, Time magazine reported that the "New York City alumni, who had waged a furious fight to end Yale's policy of graduate coaches and demanded a proven winner from outside" were enraged that Michigan's Harry Kipke had not been invited to coach the team. Kipke had coached Michigan to consecutive national championships in 1932 and 1933. The alumni probably desired a reversal of the program's decline versus Harvard. Yale led The Game series 22–6–5 from 1875 to 1912; however, from 1913-33, Harvard led the series 11–7–1. Pond, whose head coaching experience had been two seasons at Hotchkiss, was the last alumnus head coach of football at Yale. Reginald Root, head coach for the 1933 season and an alumnus, had a .500 record and lost to Harvard.

Pond coached an historically significant game in 1934 versus Princeton. The 1934 contest was the last time a group of 11 starters played the entire 60 minutes of a game. At Palmer Stadium, Yale ended Princeton's 15-game winning streak with a 7–0 upset on November 17. The New York Times (November 17, 1934) reported that an expected capacity crowd of 52,000 would attend the contest, the 58th in the series. Princeton won another 12 consecutive games after the loss.  The Yale starters, Larry Kelley among them, were nicknamed Iron Men by the press. Kelley scored the contest's sole touchdown. Fritz Crisler, considered the father of two-platoon football, was Pond's counterpart at Princeton. The contest has been subject of two books, Yale's Ironmen: A Story of Football & Lives in The Decade of the Depression & Beyond and Football's Last Iron Men: 1934, Yale vs. Princeton, And One Stunning Upset.

Pond coached two Heisman Trophy winners while at Yale. End Larry Kelley in 1936 and halfback Clint Frank in 1937 were the second and third winners of the most prestigious individual award in football. Among the total of 21 assistants employed by Pond at Yale, future President Gerald Ford served for four seasons, 1937–1940, while attending Yale Law School, and Greasy Neale was hired as the backfield coach right after Pond's announced elevation on February 1, 1934. Neale had coached West Virginia to a 3–5–3 record in 1933, his third year there. Neale was clearly the chief strategist among the coaches.

Honors
Yale's athletic department awards annually the Raymond W. Pond Pitching Award.

Head coaching record

References

External links
 

1902 births
1982 deaths
American football halfbacks
Baseball pitchers
Bates Bobcats football coaches
Georgia Pre-Flight Skycrackers football coaches
Yale Bulldogs baseball players
Yale Bulldogs football coaches
Yale Bulldogs football players
United States Navy personnel of World War II
American public relations people
United States Navy officers
Hotchkiss School alumni
People from Torrington, Connecticut
Players of American football from Connecticut